Scorpion Air was an airline based in Sofia, Bulgaria. It was established in 1990 and was a general aviation company operating domestic and international charter services using helicopters and fixed-wing aircraft.  Its operating certificate was revoked on 21 June 2007, however may have still continued operations years after, since on 14 June 2011, Paul Hurst, the Managing Director of Solenta Aviation at the time, stated on the PPRuNE forum that Scorpion Air operates all of Solenta Aviation’s Antonov fleet, one them being involved in Solenta Aviation Gabon Flight 122A.

Code data 
ICAO Code: SPN
Callsign: AIR SKORPIO

Fleet
 Antonov An-12
 Kamov Ka-32AO
 Mil Mi-8
 Mil Mi-26T

References

External links 
 

Defunct airlines of Bulgaria
Airlines established in 1990
Airlines disestablished in 2007
Bulgarian companies established in 1990